Alicia Kempner is an American bridge player from Palm Springs, California.

Bridge accomplishments

Wins
 North American Bridge Championships (5)
 Wagar Women's Knockout Teams (2) 1962, 1969 
 Barclay Trophy (1) 1954
 Chicago Mixed Board-a-Match (2) 1946, 1960

Runners-up
 North American Bridge Championships
 Rockwell Mixed Pairs (1) 1955 
 Whitehead Women's Pairs (1) 1965

Notes

External links
 

Living people
American contract bridge players
Year of birth missing (living people)
Place of birth missing (living people)
People from Palm Springs, California